The St. John–Lena Border Crossing connects the towns of St. John, North Dakota and Killarney, Manitoba on the Canada–United States border. North Dakota Highway 30 on the American side joins Manitoba Highway 18 on the Canadian side.

Canadian side
W.J. Cooper was the inaugural customs officer 1889–1895. Under the administrative oversight of the Port of Winnipeg, the office handled goods received by road. In 1899, oversight transferred to the Port of Brandon. Inconveniently located and vulnerable to smuggling, the office moved to the border in 1930, adopting the name of Lena, the nearest post office.

The building was replaced in 1961.

In 2020, the former border hours of 8am–9pm reduced, becoming 8am–4pm.

US side

The US border station was built in 1937, and was added to the U.S. National Register of Historic Places in 2014.

See also
 List of Canada–United States border crossings

References

Canada–United States border crossings
National Register of Historic Places in Rolette County, North Dakota
Government buildings on the National Register of Historic Places in North Dakota
1930 establishments in Manitoba
1930 establishments in North Dakota